The Skin Tyee First Nation, also known as the Skin Tyee Indian Band is a First Nations band government located in the Central Interior of British Columbia near François Lake, in the Omineca Country to the west of the City of Prince George.

Demographics
Number of Band Members: 184

Governance 
Skin Tyee is a section 11 band that follows a custom electoral system.

Indian Reserves
Indian Reserves under the administration of the Skin Tyee First Nation are:
 Skins Lake Indian Reserve No. 15, north of Skins Lake, at the head of the Cheslatta River, 183.70 ha.
 Skins Lake Indian Reserve No. 16A, 3/4 mile southeast of Octopus Lake, which is 2 miles south of Francois Lake, 64.7 ha.
 Skins Lake Indian Reserve No. 16B, on northwest shore of Uncha Lake, 64.7 ha.
 Tatla't East Indian Reserve No. 2, 56.10 ha.
 Uncha Lake Indian Reserve No. 13A, north shore of Uncha Lake, near wet end, 24.10 ha.
 Western Island Indian Reserve No. 4, a small island at the west end of Uncha Lake, 3.3 ha.

References

Dakelh governments
Omineca Country